The Berteling Building, (also known as the Forbes Building) is a historic commercial building located at 228 West Colfax, South Bend, St. Joseph County, Indiana.

Description and history 
It was built in 1905, and is a three-story, Commercial style brick building. A small two-story, rear addition was constructed prior to 1917. The building originally housed office space for several doctors. It is located next to the Commercial Building. It is significant as one of the oldest commercial buildings in South Bend.

It was listed on the National Register of Historic Places on June 5, 1985.

References

Commercial buildings on the National Register of Historic Places in Indiana
Bungalow architecture in Indiana
Commercial buildings completed in 1905
Buildings and structures in South Bend, Indiana
National Register of Historic Places in St. Joseph County, Indiana
Chicago school architecture in Indiana
1905 establishments in Indiana